Ahlmann Ridge, also known as Ahlmannryggen, is a broad, mainly ice-covered ridge, about  long, surmounted by scattered, low peaks. It rises between Schytt Glacier and Jutulstraumen Glacier and extends from Borg Massif northward to Fimbul Ice Shelf in Queen Maud Land. The area was first photographed from aircraft of the Third German Antarctic Expedition (1938–39) and peaks in this vicinity were roughly plotted. The Stein Nunataks and Witte Peaks, named by the German Antarctic Expedition, appear to coincide with the northeast part of the Ahlmann Ridge. The feature was mapped in detail from surveys and air photos by the Norwegian-British-Swedish Antarctic Expedition (NBSAE) (1949–1952) and air photos by the Norwegian expedition (1958–59). Named for Hans Wilhelmsson Ahlmann, chairman of the Swedish committee for the NBSAE.

Istindhalsen Saddle is an ice saddle between Istind Peak and the Grunehogna Peaks on the Ahlmann Ridge. Like the ridge, it was mapped by the NBSAE and the Norwegian expedition. It was named Istindhalsen meaning "the ice peak neck" in association with Istind Peak.

Features
Brautnuten Peak
Kullen Knoll
Ove Peak
Nupshamrane Peaks
Slettfjellklumpen Spur
Slettfjellnutane Peaks
Snøkallen Hill
Straumsida Bluff
Veslekletten Peak
Vesletind Peak

References 

Ridges of Queen Maud Land
Princess Martha Coast